Phycita roborella is a moth of the family Pyralidae. It is – under its junior synonym Tinea spissicella – the type species of its genus Phycita, and by extension of the subfamily Phycitinae.

It is found in Europe. The wingspan is 24–29 mm. The moth flies in one generation from the end of June to September .

The caterpillars feed on oak, apple and pear.

Notes
The flight season refers to Belgium and The Netherlands. This may vary in other parts of the range.

External links

 waarneming.nl 
 Lepidoptera of Belgium
 Phycita roborella on UKmoths

Moths described in 1775
Phycitini
Moths of Europe